Kerberos may refer to:

 Kerberos (mythology) or Cerberus, the hound of Hades

Science and technology
 Kerberos (protocol), a computer network authentication protocol
 Kerberos (moon), a moon of Pluto
 Kerberos (mammal), an extinct genus of carnivorous mammal

Arts and entertainment
 Kerberos (magazine), a discontinued Swedish-language satirical magazine in Finland
 Keroberos or Cerberus, a character from Cardcaptor Sakura
 Kerberos saga, a science fiction series by Mamoru Oshii
 Kerberos Dante, a character from Saint Seiya
 Kerberos, name of ship in Netflix series 1899

Other uses
 Kerberos Productions, a game development studio

See also
 
 Cerberus (disambiguation)